The Local Court of New South Wales is the lowest court in the judicial hierarchy of the Australian state of New South Wales. Formerly known as the Court of Petty Sessions and the Magistrates Court, there are more than 160 branches across New South Wales where the Local Court has jurisdiction to deal with the majority of minor civil and criminal matters.

Matters are heard before a single magistrate sitting without a jury, addressed as "Your Honour" or "Sir" (but no longer "Your worship"). The Local Court has no jurisdiction for claims in equity.

On appeal, matters may be heard by the District Court of New South Wales including appeals against the sentence or conviction decided in the Local Court.

The Chief Magistrate of the Local Court is Judge Peter Johnstone, former President of the NSW Children's Court, who was appointed in September 2021. Judge Johnstone succeeded Judge Graeme Henson, appointed in 2006.

History

In 1788, following the landing of the First Fleet and establishment of the Colony of New South Wales, the power and authority of the first criminal and civil courts in the Colony of New South Wales were vested by the Charter of Justice.

Structure and jurisdiction
The Local Court of New South Wales hears civil matters of a monetary value of up to $100,000; mental health matters; family law and/or child care matters; adult criminal proceedings, including committal hearings, and summary prosecutions for summary offences (i.e., offences of a less serious nature) and indictable offences; licensing issues (as the Licensing Court); industrial matters; and mining matters. In addition to this, the Local Court, via its Small Claims Division, hears claims for less than $10,000 and also hears applications for Apprehended Violence Orders (AVOs). The local court can deal with applications such as property settlements and residence orders.

A magistrate can imprison offenders for no more than two years per sentence and no more than the maximum of five years for multiple sentences.

The Children's Court is a division within the Local Court that hears matters involving minors, or those that have not yet reached the age of 18, and is a closed court (i.e., the general public may not attend). The press can attend but may not publish the identity of the offender.

The Coroner's Court is another division within the Local Court that investigates violent or unnatural deaths, suspicious fires and/or explosions, but it cannot make orders to punish offenders. Coroners may, however, terminate their proceedings and pass on their findings onto state or federal Directors of Public Prosecutions for initiation of proceedings in another court at their discretion.

See also

Courthouses in New South Wales
List of New South Wales courts and tribunals
Victims Compensation Tribunal

References

External links

Practice Notes - Local Courts New South Wales
Chief Magistrate - Local Courts New South Wales

New South Wales courts and tribunals